Ōkataina Caldera (Ōkataina Volcanic Centre, also spelled Okataina) is a massive, recently active volcanic caldera and its associated volcanoes located in Taupō Volcanic Zone of New Zealand's North Island. It is just east of the smaller Rotorua Caldera and southwest of the much smaller Rotomā Embayment which is usually regarded as an associated volcano. It is best known for its high rates of explosive rhyolitic volcanism although its last eruption was basaltic. Confusingly the postulated Haroharo Caldera contained within it, has sometimes been described in almost interchangeable terms with the Ōkataina Caldera or volcanic complex or centre and by other authors as a separate complex. Since 2010 other terms such as the Haroharo vent alignment, Utu Caldera, Matahina Caldera, Rotoiti Caldera and a postulated Kawerau Caldera have replaced this classification.

Geography
The north east boundary bisects Lake Rotoiti and the north east includes all of Lake Rotomā. The south west corner is defined by the domes of the Ōkareka Embayment and the Waimangu Volcanic Rift Valley while the south east aspect is dominated by Mount Tarawera and the volcanic badlands of the Puhipuhi Basin. The caldera also contains several lakes, including part or all of Lake Ōkareka, Lake Ōkataina, Lake Rotoehu, Lake Rotomā, Lake Rotoiti, Lake Rotomahana, Lake Tarawera and Lake Tikitapu.

Geology
The caldera is now thought to contain the Utu Caldera, the major event Matahina Caldera, the Rotoiti Caldera, and the Kawerau Caldera with three associated geologically embayments. These are Rotomā  Embayment, historically regarded as a caldera, the Ōkareka Embayment as another, now in-filled caldera and the Puripuri Embayment.

Eruptions

The caldera has seen six eruptions in the past 10,000 years, most recently the 1886 Mount Tarawera eruption in the caldera's southeastern corner.  The caldera contains two major lava dome complexes, the Haroharo vent alignment in the north and Tarawera vent alignment in the south. Other volcanoes connected with the caldera include Putauaki (Mount Edgecumbe)  and the maar crater of Lake Rotokawau which is most likely to have formed from a basaltic dike extrusion associated with the common magma mush body.

Threat
While most currently active New Zealand volcanoes produce small eruptions relatively frequently, Ōkataina's volcanoes tend to erupt very violently after intervals of centuries. As such, they pose significant potential threats to the Bay of Plenty Region but are also the most significant volcanic risk in New Zealand. During the last 20,000 years, pyroclastic and lava eruptions have occurred of several types; low-silicate basalt eruptions, high-silicate rhyolite eruptions, and the rarer intermediate andesite and dacite eruptions. The most common magma type at Ōkataina is rhyolite.

How and Why
The reason for the various types relate to the underlying arc volcanism, which is driven initially by large inputs of basaltic melt (from in this case the subducted Pacific Plate). These basaltic melts often never reach the surface due to a relatively high density of the magma compared to the surrounding Australian Plate crust. An example of dyke intrusion that never reached the surface, was manifest as an earthquake swarm during a recent period of volcanic unrest. Usually, these intrusions cool in the crust and either solidify to gabbroic plutons or are associated with the generation of more evolved magmas with higher silicate content that separate and ascend to then erupt as rhyolite, dacite, or andesite, possibly primed by a basaltic melt predecessor.  These evolved intrusions can also cool without erupting to form a felsic pluton. In the case of the Ōkataina Caldera the sub-surface architecture is known to be made up of discrete rhyolitic melt-mush pockets that erupt compositionally distinct magmas within single eruptions. The mush pockets are not usually andesitic but in a region towards the east of the Caldera, in the Puhipuhi Embayment, have been dacitic. Little is known of the evolution of the primary basaltic magmas that generate these more evolved rhyolitic magmas and they may not be the same basaltic melts that sometimes cause the final eruption for all that is known. Heat and volatiles are assumed to be transferred between basalts and rhyolites. Basaltic-rhyolitic magma interaction definitely happens (the evidence is in the science of compositional analysis done world wide), and will be a factor in the many different eruption styles that have occurred. Sometimes basalt appears to lead the eruption, at other times it has been postulated that tectonic earthquakes are the final enabler of an eruption.

Any basaltic magmas that do reach the surface will have traversed this complicated crustal region and often erupt as a dyke. This must have happened with the 1886 Mount Tarawera eruption which was basaltic and so the initiating magma melt source during its rise to the surface did not transverse a region with more evolved magma melt. In the context that there is evidence for a magma reservoir under the caldera, the absence of a more evolved magma from the 1886 eruptives might have been because it was too soon after the last eruption for such evolution to have occurred, the basaltic melt angled in missing a pre existing more evolved melt or that the evolved melt was solid when transversed. The common very explosive nature of any secondary rhyolite eruptions after this basaltic melt priming is related to rhyolite's viscosity, further complicated by its accumulation time as it is less able to find its way to the surface compared to say the more fluid andesite.

History
It is likely that the volcanic history of the area began some 625,000 years ago. The caldera was formed by at least five huge eruptions between 400,000 and 50,000 years ago, causing the collapse of the ground. The shape of the Matahina caldera was then modified (and buried/destroyed) by eight smaller eruptions and other processes which occurred between 70,000 and 24,000 years ago. For example the dacite Puripuri basin/embayment is a subsidence related feature related to lateral magma migration towards the eastern caldera margins of mainly the Matahina caldera. The Rotoiti caldera is to the north of the Utu caldera. However one of these events can be assigned to the Kawerau Ignimbrite eruption of 33,000 years ago as a location within the central part of the Matahina Caldera at level of the Puhipuhi Basin. Although the latest caldera models include the Haroharo vent alignment they do not include the existence of a Haroharo caldera.
Volcanoes within the caldera are known to have erupted eleven times in the last 21,000 years, with all but two of those eruptions being rhyolite. The Rotoma eruptions are those of an embayment and the lateral magma erupted is associated with subsidence back to the eastern Rotoiti caldera margin. The Ōkareka Embayment to the west is also associated with caldera rim subsidence, this time the western shared rims of the Utu, Matahina and Rotoiti calderas. Two of these eruptions, both at Tarawera, occurred within the last 2000 years (in 1886 and ). The most explosive of the eruptions in the last 21,000 years is likely to have been on the Haroharo vent alignment in about 5500 BCE, which ejected some 17 cubic kilometres of magma. In summary the more significant eruptions have been:

Tectonics
Faults are not defined under this very active caldera but the existence of at least one paired eruption at the far north and south extremes of the caldera 61,000 years ago at Earthquake Flat and at Rotoiti suggest potential volcanicotectonic interaction. The active Paeroa Fault terminates at the caldera edge and the active Ngapouri-Rotomahana Fault is just to the south. The two recently active main vent alignments in the Ōkataina Caldera being the Horahora and Tarawera vents are parallel with these identifiable faults outside the caldera, however the faults are not on the exact vent line. In the last 9,500 years four of the seven major ruptures of the  Manawahe Fault have been associated in time with an volcanic eruption of the Okataina volcanic centre. This fault is just to the east of Lake Rotoma at the boundary between the tectonic Whakatane and the magmatic Ōkataina segments of the Taupō Rift. These are the Whakatane eruption of about 5500 years ago, the Mamaku eruption of about 8000 years ago and at least two fault ruptures in  before or during the Rotoma eruption of 9500 years ago. Similarly the Ngapouri-Rotomahana Fault and Paeroa Fault have multiple ruptures associated in time with volcanism including immediately prior to the Mamaku and Rotoma rhyolite eruptions in the case of the Paeroa Fault and of the Ngapouri-Rotomahana Fault immediately prior to the Kaharoa eruption.   At least 30% of major Taupō Volcanic Zone eruptions have now been associated with significant local fault ruptures within  of the eruption.

References 

Calderas of New Zealand
 
Taupō Volcanic Zone
VEI-7 volcanoes
Pleistocene calderas
Holocene calderas
Volcanoes of the Bay of Plenty Region
Rift volcanoes